Pokahontaz is a Polish hip-hop group, founded in 2003 in Katowice by Rahim, Fokus and DJ Bambus.

Discography

Studio albums

Music videos

References

Polish hip hop groups